William Fletcher Parrett (August 10, 1825 – June 30, 1895) was an American lawyer and politician who served two terms as a U.S. Representative from Indiana from 1889 to 1893.

Biography 
Born near Blairsville, Indiana, Parrett attended the public schools and the Indiana Asbury (now De Pauw) University at Greencastle.
He studied law.
He was admitted to the bar and practiced in Evansville, Indiana, until 1852.
He moved to Oregon, where he practiced law for two and a half years.
He returned to Evansville in 1854, and moved to Boonville, Indiana, in 1855.

Political career 
He served as member of the State house of representatives in 1858 and served during the general and special sessions.
He was appointed and subsequently elected judge of the fifteenth circuit and served from 1859 to 1865.
He returned to Evansville.

He was reelected circuit judge and served from 1865 to 1871.
He was appointed judge of the first circuit and elected in 1873, 1879, and 1884.
He resigned in December 1888.

Congress 
Parrett was elected as a Democrat to the Fifty-first and Fifty-second Congresses (March 4, 1889 – March 3, 1893).
He was not a candidate for renomination in 1892.

Later career and death 
He resumed the practice of law until his death in Evansville, Indiana, June 30, 1895.
He was interred in Oak Hill Cemetery.

References

 

1825 births
1895 deaths
Politicians from Evansville, Indiana
Indiana state court judges
Democratic Party members of the United States House of Representatives from Indiana
People from Posey County, Indiana
People from Boonville, Indiana
19th-century American politicians
19th-century American judges